This is a list of select records in top-level international under-19 cricket (also known as youth cricket), which includes Test (multi-day) matches,  One Day International (one-day) matches and Twenty20 International matches. The records are sourced from CricketArchive and ESPNcricinfo, and were last updated on 12 March 2020.

Under-19 Test cricket

Team records

Teams by date of first match

 17 July 1974: , 
 20 January 1979: , 
 12 February 1979: 
 11 February 1984: 
 6 February 1986: 
 20 July 1995: 
 13 January 1996: 
 28 July 2004: 

Highest scores
 646/9 dec. –  v. ; County Ground, Chelmsford; 16–19 August 2003
 620/9 dec. –  v. ; Trent Bridge, Nottingham; 15–18 August 2001
 611/9 dec. –  v. ; Arbab Niaz Stadium, Peshawar; 13–15 September 2006
 610 –  v. ; Cornwall Park, Auckland; 15–18 March 1987
 576/7 –  v. ; County Ground, Bristol; 16–19 August 1986

Lowest scores

 47 –  v. ; Harare Sports Club, Harare; 23–25 January 1996
 66 –  v. ; Pukekura Park, New Plymouth; 9–12 March 1987
 71 –  v. ; WACA Ground, Perth; 6–8 February 1990
 74 –  v. ; Bourda, Georgetown; 31 August – 2 September 1990
 76 –  v. ; St George's College, Weybridge; 10–12 August 1974

Individual records

Batting

Most career runs

 1,624 –  Hasan Raza; 1996–1999
 1,156 –  Tanmay Srivastava; 2006–2008
 1,058 –  John Crawley; 1989–1991
 1,032 –  Marcus Trescothick; 1993–1995
 932 –  Virat Kohli; 2006–2008

Highest career batting averages (ten innings or more)

 116.16 –  David Nash; 1995–1996
 77.06 –  Tanmay Srivastava; 2006–2008
 71.54 –  Damien Martyn; 1990–1991
 60.66 –  Mathew Dowman; 1993
 59.61 –  Ian Stenhouse; 1985–1986

Highest individual scores

 304* –  Clinton Peake v. ; Melbourne Cricket Ground, Melbourne; 10–13 March 1995
 267 –  Mathew Dowman v. ; County Ground, Hove; 26–29 August 1993
 260* –  Kevin Sharp v. ; County Ground, Worcester; 5–8 August 1978
 254 –  Gordon Muchall v. ; Sophia Gardens, Cardiff; 27–30 July 2002
 220 –  Tanmay Srivastava v. ; Arbab Niaz Stadium, Peshawar; 13–15 September 2006

Bowling

Most career wickets

 64 –  Abdul Razzaq; 1996–1997
 57 –  Imran Tahir; 1996–1997
 52 –  Balaji Rao; 1994–1997
 43 –  Ashish Zaidi; 1989–1990
 41 –  Piyush Chawla; 2005–2007

Lowest career bowling averages (100 overs or more)

 8.76 –  Ravi Jadeja; 2006–2008
 12.16 –  Tyrone Knight; 1974
 12.31 –  Thilan Samaraweera; 1994
 12.68 –  Kenroy Peters; 2001
 13.88 –  Saqlain Mushtaq; 1995

Best bowling in an innings

 9/57 –  Ashish Zaidi v. ; Modi Stadium, Kanpur; 10–13 January 1990
 8/38 –  Vidyut Sivaramakrishnan v. ; Wankhede Stadium, Mumbai; 9–12 January 2001
 8/86 –  Tyrone Knight v. ; Arundel Castle Cricket Ground, Arundel; 31 July – 2 August 1974
 8/118 –  Graeme Swann v. ; County Ground, Taunton; 25–28 August 1998
 8/157 –  Adil Rashid v. ; County Ground, Taunton; 1–4 August 2006

Best bowling in a match

 12/92 –  Tim Southee v. ; Carisbrook, Dunedin; 27–30 January 2007
 12/99 –  Fazl-e-Akbar v. ; Goodyear Park, Bloemfontein; 6–9 February 1997
 12/122 –  Vidyut Sivaramakrishnan v. ; Wankhede Stadium, Mumbai; 9–12 January 2001
 12/147 –  Ashish Zaidi v. ; Modi Stadium, Kanpur; 10–13 January 1990
 12/150 –  Mushtaq Ahmed v. ; Iqbal Stadium, Faisalabad; 15–18 February 1989

Miscellaneous

Most wicket-keeping dismissals

 38 –  Humayun Farhat; 1996–1999
 36 –  Robert Rollins; 1991–1993
 32 –  Mark Wallace; 1998–2001
 29 –  Moin Khan; 1989–1990
 28 –  Wayne Noon; 1989–1990

Most appearances

 18 –  Hasan Raza
 16 –  Glen Chapple
 15 –  David Sales
 14 –  Andrew Flintoff;  Shoaib Malik;  Robert Rollins
 13 –  Ian Bell;  Mark Broadhurst;  John Crawley;  Alex Morris;  Marcus Trescothick

Under-19 ODI cricket

Team records

Highest scores
 480/6 (50 overs) –  v. ; Carisbrook, Dunedin; 20 January 2002
 436/4 (50 overs) -  v. ; Hagley Oval, Christchurch; 17 January 2018
 425/3 (50 overs) –  v. ; Bangabandhu National Stadium, Dhaka; 16 February 2004
 402/3 (50 overs) –  v. ; Carisbrook, Dunedin; 21 January 2002
 398/6 (50 overs) –  v. ; Vaal Reefs Cricket Club, Orkney; 15 January 1998
 389/2 (50 overs) –  v. ; Bangladesh Krira Shikkha Protisthan, Dhaka; 19 February 2004

Lowest scores

 22 (22.3 overs) –  v. ; M. A. Aziz Stadium, Chittagong; 22 February 2004
 34 (14.5 overs) –  v. ; Gaddafi Stadium, Lahore; 4 November 2003
 41 (28.4 overs) –  v. ; North Harbour Stadium, Albany; 25 January 2002
 41 (11.4 overs) –  v. ; Bayuemas Oval, Kuala Lumpur; 24 February 2008
 41 (22.4 overs) –  v. ; Mangaung Oval, Bloemfontein; 21 January 2020

Individual records

Batting

Most career runs

 1,820 –  Nazmul Hossain Shanto; 2013–2016
 1,695 –  Sami Aslam; 2012–2014
 1,409 –  Quinton de Kock; 2010–2012
 1,404 –  Mohit Jain; 2012–2014
 1,326 –  Anamul Haque; 2009–2012

Highest career batting averages (ten innings or more)

 76.75 –  Mohit Jain; 2005–2006
 67.58 –  Sidharth Singh; 2011–2012
 64.56 –  Jake Doran; 2013–2015
 63.40 –  Will Bosisto; 2011–2012
 62.27 –  Brett Williams; 1987–1988

Highest individual scores

 179* –  Theo Doropoulos v. ; Hurstville Oval, Sydney; 11 February 2003
 177* –  Mohit Jain v. ; County Ground, Taunton; 30 August 2002
 176 –  Donovan Pagon v. ; Carisbrook, Dunedin; 21 January 2002
 174 –  Daniel Lawrence v. ; M. A. Aziz Stadium, Chittagong; 27 January 2016
 164* –  James Marshall v. ; LC de Villiers Oval, Pretoria; 15 January 1998

Bowling

Most career wickets

 80 –  Mehedi Hasan Miraz; 2013–2016
 73 –  Imad Wasim; 2005–2008
 71 –  Piyush Chawla; 2003–2007
 66 –  Mahmudul Hasan; 2007–2010
 64 –  Sachith Pathirana; 2005–2008

Lowest career bowling averages (100 overs or more)

 11.82 –  Mansoor Amjad; 2003–2004
 12.00 –  Mehrab Hossain; 2005–2006
 12.00 –  Lahiru Madushanka; 2011–2012
 12.58 –  Iqbal Abdulla; 2007–2008
 12.96 –  Wayne Parnell; 2006–2008

Best bowling in an innings

 9/16 –  Irfan Pathan v. ; Gaddafi Stadium, Lahore; 4 November 2003
 7/19 –  Jeevan Mendis v. ; Hagley Oval, Christchurch; 24 January 2002
 7/20 –  Trent Boult v. ; Johor Cricket Academy Oval, Johor; 21 February 2008
 7/41 –  Justin Bishop v. ; County Ground, Chelmsford; 29 July 2001
 6/3 –  Rahul Vishwakarma v. ; Peter Burge Oval, Brisbane; 23 August 2012

Miscellaneous

Most wicket-keeping dismissals

 52 –  Saifullah Bangash; 2012–2014
 51 –  Dinesh Chandimal; 2007–2009
 51 –  Quinton de Kock; 2010–2012
 41 –  Pinal Shah; 2005–2006
 41 –  Anamul Haque; 2009–2012

Most appearances

 58 –  Nazmul Hossain Shanto; 2013–2016
 57 –  Mahmudul Hasan; 2007–2010
 56 –  Mehedi Hasan Miraz; 2013–2016
 49 –  Imad Wasim; 2005–2008
 43 –  Joyraz Sheik; 2013–2016

Under-19 T20I cricket

Team records

Highest scores

 209/2 (20 overs) –  v. ; Harare Sports Club, Harare; 12  July 2010
 184/8 (20 overs) –  v. ; Boland Park, Paarl; 22 Jan 2011
 166/1 (18.1 overs) –  v. ; Harare Sports Club, Harare; 12 July 2010
 166/8 (20 overs) –  v. ; Harare Sports Club, Harare; 12 July 2010
 165/7 (20 overs) –  v. ; Harare Sports Club, Harare; 12 July 2010

Lowest scores (in a completed innings)

 107 (18.3 overs) –  v. ; Riverside Ground, Chester-le-Street; 2 August 2010
 118 (18 overs) –  v. ; Riverside Ground, Chester-le-Street; 3 August 2010
 120/8 (20 overs) –  v. ; Sheikh Kamal International Stadium, Cox's Bazar; 27 January 2019
 126/8 (20 overs) –  v. ; Boland Park, Paarl; 22 Jan 2009
 132/7 (20 overs) –  v. ; Newlands Stadium, Cape Town; 21 Jan 2009

Individual records

Batting
Most career runs

 221 –  James Price; 2010–2011
 151 –  Quinton de Kock; 2011
 137 –  Keaton Jennings; 2010–2011
 107 –  Kevin Kasuza; 2011
 90 –  Jack Manuel; 2009–2010

Highest individual scores

 102* –  Quinton de Kock v. ; Northerns–Goodwood Cricket Club Oval, Goodwood; 23 January 2011
 98* –  James Price v. ; Harare Sports Club, Harare; 12 July 2010
 74* –  Faraz Ali v. ; St. George's College Ground, Harare; 9 October 2009
 74 –  Amit Majumder v. ; London Road, Sleaford; 28 July 2009
 72* –  Rameez Aziz v. ; St. John's College Ground, Harare; 2 October 2009

Bowling
Most career wickets

 5 –  Kaleem Sana (2009) and  Keagan Rafferty (2010–2011)
 4 –  Azeem Rafiq (2009),  Chathura Peiris (2010),  Obus Pienaar (2009) and  Tanzim Hasan Sakib (2019)

Best bowling in an innings

 4/30 –  Tanzim Hasan Sakib v. ; Sheikh Kamal International Stadium, Cox's Bazar; 27 January 2019
 3/17 –  Joe Root v. ; Riverside Ground, Chester-le-Street; 3 August 2010
 3/19 –  Raza Hasan v. ; St. George's College Ground, Harare; 9 October 2009
 3/20 –  Tinotenda Mutombodzi v. ; St. Johns's College Ground, Harare; 2 October 2009
 3/20 –  Chathura Peiris v. ; Riverside Ground, Chester-le-Street; 2 August 2010

References

Under-19
Under-19